Vadda Mattam is a small village in Gurdaspur district, Panjab state in Western India.

References

Villages in Ratnagiri district